KMET was a Los Angeles FM radio station owned by Metromedia (hence the "MET" in its call sign) that broadcast at 94.7 MHz beginning on May 2, 1966. It signed off on February 14, 1987. The station, nicknamed "The Mighty Met" (among other nicknames), was a pioneering station of the "underground" progressive rock format.

History
As with many FM stations at the time, KMET featured an automated format (with female voices and middle-of-the-road music). The origin of KMET's freeform rock music format came about due to events at a rival radio station. In 1967, popular Top 40 disc jockey Tom Donahue (Rock Radio Hall of Fame inductee 2015) and his wife Raechel took the FM underground rock sound to KMPX in San Francisco, and soon, along with  L.A. Top 40 personality B. Mitchel Reed, to KPPC-FM in Pasadena. Both stations quickly became popular with their innovative formats, and brought the owners more success than they encountered before. But it was to be short-lived. After conflicts with the stations’ owners, the Donahues, Reed and the rest of the KPPC and KMPX staff left both stations and went on strike. As prospects for resolving the strike looked hopeless (the owners had hired scabs to continue the rock programming), Tom Donahue looked elsewhere, and eventually convinced Metromedia to install KPPC's format at KMET in June 1968. They did likewise at KMET's sister station, KSAN-FM in San Francisco. Many of the personalities at both stations transferred to Metromedia.

The KPPC format was only mildly successful. After leaving KROQ AM/FM, Shadoe Stevens was hired by General Manager L. David Moorhead in 1974 to create something new for the struggling format KMET had put in place. With a staff that included B. Mitchell Reed, Stevens, Jimmy Rabbitt, Brother John, and Mary ("The Burner") Turner, Stevens introduced a new rock format that retained some of Donahue's progressive freedom but gave it energy and consistency that featured programming and high production values similar to those that had been integrated at KROQ. Stevens also designed a futuristic billboard campaign called "Hollywood as seen from Mulholland Drive in the year 2525."

  Artist Neon Park did ads for KMET as well as the famous billboards. With this new programming design and branded marketing, in 1975 KMET became the number one radio station in Los Angeles.

KMET's station identification jingle, "A Little Bit of Heaven, Ninety-Four Point Seven - KMET - Tweedle-Dee" was originally written by Michael Shuler, a friend of the Rainbow Choir—Sandy and Teresa Smith, Melissa Levesque, and Beth Underwood—performed live in the broadcast booth on the Jeff "The Gonzer" show. The group changed the words to Mr. Shuler's song to advertise the station. Sandy Smith and Underwood had also rewritten the lyrics to "Deep Elem Blues", renaming that traditional tune "Deep L.A. Blues," specifically for Jeff Gonzer's show. After the live performance, KMET asked the Rainbow Choir if they had any other "stuff." This request was unexpected, and several station IDs were quickly created on the spot, all of them recorded, but only one was used. This ID "jingle" came to be emblematic for KMET. The live recording was used for years, but was rerecorded in the late 1970s or early 1980s with session singers.

Stevens left in 1975 to begin a production company and the station's programing was taken over by Sam Bellamy. Ms. Bellamy, who had been hired from Billboard Magazine, had been Stevens' assistant for most of the time he programmed the station.

At the time, the studios of KMET and its local AM counterpart, country-western KLAC, were located across the street from the La Brea Tar Pits on Wilshire Blvd. In Summer 1976, both stations moved to the then-Metromedia complex where KTTV Channel 11 was located.

KMET stood in direct contrast to other music stations of the era.  KMET and other progressive-rock stations played more eclectic artists with much longer songs and more socially-conscious lyrics than the Top 40 AM stations. The disc jockeys talked far less, and in a more personal, relaxed manner. They voiced their opinions on controversial topics, such as the killing of whales, the spraying of marijuana with the toxic chemical Paraquat, the Vietnam War and civil rights, and most importantly they chose the music that they played on the air. Emblematic of this approach was longtime KMET late-night host Jim Ladd (fired October 25, 2011 by one-time rival KLOS-FM and currently hosting his own show on SiriusXM), whose laid-back philosophical ruminations usually led into a song, from artists such as Bob Dylan, John Lennon, Pink Floyd, The Doors or Led Zeppelin—that underscored his point.

KMET often mixed counterculture comedy skits by the Firesign Theatre and the Credibility Gap with the music. The Credibility Gap broadcast satirical skits during Pasadena's Tournament of Roses Parade in the 1970s. Another KMET staple at the time was Dr. Demento, whose variety show began on KPPC-FM. The Dr. Demento Show moved to KMET-FM in 1972 and soon became the most listened-to Sunday evening radio program in Los Angeles. Following Dr. Demento on Sunday nights, Mike Harrison hosted a phone-in talk show called Harrison's Mike.

KMET aired live concerts that went on to become seminal recordings. David Bowie's show at the Santa Monica Civic Auditorium on 20 October 1972 during the Ziggy Stardust Tour was aired by KMET. Bootlegs of the broadcast were widely distributed, even in chain record stores, before it gained a semi-official release in 1994 and then an official release in 2008. According to author David Buckley, possessing a copy of the bootleg was the test of a "proper Bowie fan".

On July 7, 1978, KMET aired Bruce Springsteen's concert live from the Roxy. Many songs from that broadcast were included on Bruce Springsteen and the E Street Band's album Live/1975–85.

KMET was a member of a group of progressive-rock stations that emerged across the country in the late 1960s and early 1970s, along with KSAN, WNEW-FM in New York City, WMMR in Philadelphia, WBCN in Boston, WMMS in Cleveland, and KQRS-FM in Minneapolis.

The 1978 movie FM, written by former employee Ezra Sacks, was reportedly loosely based on KMET.  The lead character was based around Mike Herrington, the program director for much of the era preceding the film.  Much of the history of KMET is documented in Jim Ladd's book Radio Waves, where the station is referred to as Radio KAOS and many of the DJs are given pseudonyms. Arguably, 1978 was the pinnacle year at the station. The line-up was impressive. Jeff Gonzer, Bob Coburn, Cynthia Fox, Jack Snyder, Mary Turner, and Jim Ladd. Ace Young and Patrick 'Paraquat' Kelley provided the breaking news and views of the day.

The progressive format thrived on KMET throughout the 1970s and into the early 1980s, at one time becoming one of the most successful FM stations in the country. But changing trends in music, culture and society, and the advent of strict formatting in radio eventually turned KMET into a relic. The station experienced staff turnover, radio consultants, tight playlists and an increasingly-impersonal approach typical of the more mainstream album oriented rock format.

KMET is also notable for broadcasting the program The Mighty METal Hour, which was hosted by Jim Ladd on Friday nights from 10PM to midnight, and showcased the music of many then-up-and-coming hard rock and heavy metal bands, including Metallica, Slayer, Megadeth, Anthrax, Iron Maiden, Queensrÿche, Mötley Crüe, Motörhead, Y&T, Metal Church, Great White, Armored Saint, Dio, W.A.S.P., Ratt, Quiet Riot, Twisted Sister, Saxon, Riot, Loudness, Warrior and Agent Steel.

Metromedia fired the entire KMET on-air staff on February 9, 1987, signing off its album rock format at Noon on February 14, 1987, with The Beatles' "Golden Slumbers Medley" (Golden Slumbers / Carry That Weight / The End). KMET was replaced by the new-age KTWV "The Wave". Today, "The Wave" has evolved into a Smooth Jazz format, though now plays Urban Adult Contemporary and is owned by Entercom, which merged with CBS Radio in 2017. The KMET call letters have been since reassigned to an AM Talk radio station, KMET in Banning, California.

Tributes 
On June 21, 2009, Los Angeles radio station KSWD ("The Sound 100.3") announced that on July 10, 2009, it would do a one-day revival of KMET complete with the original airchecks and many of the on-air staff from the station's heyday. The Sound had another KMET reunion from November 1 to 3, 2013.

KMET was inducted into the Rock Radio Hall of Fame in the "Legends of Rock Radio-Stations" category in 2014.

On-air staff 

Billy Jugs
Richard Beebe
Sam Bellamy
Barbara Birdfeather (1969–1971)
Bobby Blue
 Damion Bragdon, aka "Damion" 
 Lynda Clayton
Bob Coburn (Rockline)
Al "Jazzbo" Collins (1966)
Sky Daniels
Dr. Demento
Raechel Donahue
Tom Donahue
Cynthia Fox
Tom "Uncle T" Gamache
Jeff Gonzer
Bob Griffith
 Mike Harrison
Patrick 'Paraquat' Kelley
 Richard Kimball
Frank DeSantis
E.J. Knight
Jim Ladd
John Langan
Pat Martin (broadcaster)
Brad Messer
L. David Moorhead. General mgr.
Deirdre O'Donoghue (Breakfast with the Beatles) (1983-?)
Thom O'Hare
Martin Perlich
David Perry
Jim Pewter (1970–1973)
Jimmy Rabbitt
B. Mitchel Reed
Billy Pearl
William (Rosko) Mercer
Rick Scarry
Brent Seltzer
Shana
Lee 'Baby' Simms
China Smith
Frazer Smith
Freddy Zermeno
Jack Snyder
Shadoe Stevens
Bill Todd
Ron Middag
Mary Turner
Gabriel Wisdom
Ace Young (1971–1983 and 1985–1987)
Rick Lewis of The Lewis and floorwax show
Steven Clean (1973-1975)

References

External links 
KMET on 440: Satisfaction
Where Are They Now? - Los Angeles Radio People

MET
Metromedia
Defunct radio stations in the United States
Radio stations established in 1966
1966 establishments in California
1987 disestablishments in California
Radio stations disestablished in 1987
MET